Fort James may refer to:

Places
 Fort James (South Dakota), a historic fort (built in 1865 by soldiers sent to protect settlers) which is on the National Register of Historic Places listings in South Dakota (39HS48)
 Fort James (Ghana) in Accra
 Fort James (Tobago)
 Fort James, Antigua and Barbuda
 Fort James, a former fort on Burrow Island in Gosport
 Fort James, located on James Island (Gambia)
 Fort Amsterdam, New York City, originally named Fort James
 Fort Berthold, North Dakota, originally named Fort James, a fur trading post renamed in 1846
 Fort Severn First Nation, originally named Fort James, a fur-trading post built by Hudson's Bay Company in 1689, in Northern Ontario, Canada
 James Fort, a Jamestown Rediscovery site, built in 1607 on the site of the British colony later renamed Jamestowne
 Fort James, an English fort in Port Royal, Jamaica, that was destroyed in the 1692 Jamaica earthquake, sinking into the sea.
 Fort James (HBC vessel), operated by the HBC from 1927-1938, see Hudson's Bay Company vessels

Other uses
 Fort James Corporation, a defunct paper company acquired by Georgia-Pacific